Swinney may refer to:

People
Dabo Swinney (born 1969), the head coach of the Clemson University Tigers football team
David Swinney (1946–2006), prominent psycholinguist
Harry Swinney (born 1939), American physicist noted for his contributions to the field of nonlinear dynamics
John Swinney (born 1964), Scottish National Party (SNP) politician
Pat Swinney Kaufman (born 1950), executive director of the New York State Governor's Office for Motion Picture and Television Development
Youell Swinney (1917–1994), the only major suspect in the Phantom Killer case in Texarkana, Texas and Texarkana, Arkansas in 1946

Places
Swinney Switch, Texas, an unincorporated community also known as Swinney

See also
Gollub-Swinney circular Couette experiment helped establish the Ruelle-Takens scenario for turbulence